Emma Boada Coronado (born 22 August 1994) is a Spanish female handballer for Rincón Fertilidad Málaga and the Spanish national team.

She won the gold medal at the 2018 Mediterranean Games.

References 

Living people
1994 births
Spanish female handball players
Handball players from Catalonia
Sportspeople from Barcelona
Competitors at the 2018 Mediterranean Games
Mediterranean Games gold medalists for Spain
Mediterranean Games medalists in handball
21st-century Spanish women